Kinanoor or Kinavoor is an ancient Village capital (Karithalam/Karantholam/ Karinthalam Gramam) situated in Sahya Hill area of Kasaragod district in the state of Kerala, India.It is situated between Nileshwar and Parappa.

Demographics
As of 2011 Census,Kinavoor now modified as Kinanoor had a population of 9,728 with 4,691 males and 5,037 females. Kinanoor village had an average literacy of 89.2% higher than the national average of 74% and lower than state average of 94%.

Administration
This panchayat is administered as a part of the newly formed Vellarikundu taluk.Earlier it was Hosdurg Taluk. Kinanoor-Karindalam Panchayat is a part of Kanhangad Assembly constituency under Kasaragod Loksabha constituency.

Kinanoor Karinthalam Gramapanchayath won the second prize for water conservation in the National Water Awards 2018 instituted by the MoWRs (category: Best Village Panchayat).

Transportation
The national highway passing through Nileshwaram connects to Mangalore in the north and Kannur in the south. The nearest railway station is Nileshwar on Mangalore-Palakkad line. There are airports at Mangalore and Kannur International Airport

See also
 Bheemanadi
 Cheemeni
 West Eleri
 Kayoor
 Kavvayi
 Pilicode
 Padne
 Kinavoor

References

Nileshwaram area